The Puget Sound Business Journal (PSBJ) is a weekly American City Business Journals publication containing articles about business people, issues, and events in the greater Seattle, Washington area. The publication also publishes a technology news website named TechFlash.

In 2010, the newspaper was a finalist for a Pulitzer Prize in Explanatory Reporting for a series of stories about the foreclosure crises and the federal shutdown of Seattle-based Washington Mutual, which remains the biggest bank failure in U.S. history. The stories were reported by staff writers Kirsten Grind and Jeanne Lang Jones, and edited by Managing Editor Alwyn Scott. Congressman Dave Reichert later honored the PSBJ alongside Pulitzer winners The Seattle Times during his remarks, praising the former's "inclusive and thorough" reporting as an "invaluable public service".

References

External links

TechFlash

Newspapers published in Seattle
Business newspapers published in the United States